Aage Høy-Petersen (4 November 1898 – 29 December 1967) was a Danish sailor who competed in the 1924 Summer Olympics and in the 1928 Summer Olympics.

In 1924 he competed in the Olympic Monotype event, but he was not advance to the final. Four years later he won the silver medal as crew member of the Danish boat Hi-Hi in the 6 metre class competition.

References

External links
 
 
 
 
 

1898 births
1967 deaths
Danish male sailors (sport)
Olympic sailors of Denmark
Olympic silver medalists for Denmark
Olympic medalists in sailing
Sailors at the 1924 Summer Olympics – Monotype
Sailors at the 1928 Summer Olympics – 6 Metre
Medalists at the 1928 Summer Olympics